Balmenach distillery was established in 1824 by James McGregor, from a family of farmers and illicit distillers who resided in Tomintoul.

History 
Situated in the district of Cromdale on the banks of the River Spey the distillery stands in beneath the nearby hill of Tom Lethendry where the Jacobites were defeated in the Battle of Cromdale in 1690.

Balmenach Distillery is one of the earliest distilleries sanctioned as a result of the Excise Act 1823. In 1897 the distillery was purchased by Glenlivet and was served by its own railway branch off the Strathspey Railway until 1969. The distillery closed in 1941 and re-opened in 1947, following expansion of its facilities.

The Distillery is owned by Inver House Distillers Limited, a privately owned distiller whose other distilleries include: Speyburn-Glenlivet Distillery; Knockdhu Distillery; Balblair Distillery; and, Old Pulteney Distillery.

See also
 Whisky
 Scotch whisky
 List of whisky brands
 List of distilleries in Scotland

References

External links
 Balmenach official website.
 Inver House Distillers Limited, Corporate Website

1824 establishments in Scotland
Scottish malt whisky
Distilleries in Scotland